The Official Municipality Key, formerly also known as the Official Municipality Characteristic Number or Municipality Code Number, is a number sequence for the identification of politically independent municipalities or unincorporated areas.  Other classifications for the identification of areas include postal codes, NUTS codes or FIPS codes.

Germany 

In Germany the Official Municipality Key serves statistical purposes and is issued by the statistics offices of individual German states.  The municipality key is to be indicated in instances such as changing residence on the notice of departure or registration documents.  This is done at the registration office in every town's city hall.

Structure 
The municipality key consists of eight digits, which are generated as follows: The  designate the individual German state.  The  designates the government district (in areas without government districts a zero is used instead).  The  designate the number of the urban area (in a district-free city) or the district (in a city with districts).  The  indicate the municipality or the number of the unincorporated area.

Examples 
   : Stuttgart

 : Baden-Württemberg
 : Government district of Stuttgart
 : Urban area of Stuttgart
 : No other municipality is available, since Stuttgart is an urban area

   : Aschersleben

 : Saxony-Anhalt
 : Government district of Magdeburg
 : District of Aschersleben Staßfurt
 : City of Aschersleben

Federal States 
 01: Schleswig-Holstein
 02: Hamburg
 03: Lower Saxony
 04: Bremen
 05: North Rhine-Westphalia
 06: Hesse
07: Rhineland-Palatinate
08: Baden-Württemberg
09: Bavaria
10: Saarland
11: Berlin
12: Brandenburg
13: Mecklenburg-Vorpommern
14: Saxony
15: Saxony-Anhalt
16: Thuringia

Austria

Structure 
The municipality identifier consists of five digits in Austria, which are generated as follows: The  designates the number of the Austrian state, the  designate the district, and the  designate the municipality.

Examples 
  : Rappottenstein

 : Lower Austria
 : Zwettl district
 : Municipality of Rappottenstein

  : Vienna - Neubau

 : Vienna
 : Neubau (7th district)
 : District of Neubau

Federal States 
1 Burgenland
2 Carinthia
3 Lower Austria
4 Upper Austria
5 Salzburg
6 Styria
7 Tyrol
8 Vorarlberg
9 Vienna

Switzerland

Structure 
The Swiss Federal Statistical Office generates code numbers with up to four digits, which are sequentially assigned in accordance with the official order of the cantons, districts, and municipalities.

Cantons

France 
See Code officiel géographique.

Poland 
See System identyfikatorów i nazw miejscowości

Sweden 
A kommunkod (municipal code) is a numerical code given to all Swedish municipalities by the Swedish tax authorities.  The code consists of four digits, the first two indicating which county the municipality is situated in, and the last two specific for the municipality.

The code system was introduced with the municipal reform of 1952. There were three different categories of municipalities at the time, which affected the number that they were allocated. Those with stad-status (cities) were given codes ending in 80 to 99, smaller towns (köping) 60 to 79 and rural municipalities 01 to 59. The county seats were allocated codes ending in 80.

As part of the reform in the early 1970s, the categorization of municipalities was abolished, but the code was in most cases preserved. When several municipalities were merged, the code for the biggest municipality was kept.

Philippines

Structure

For example, the municipality of Ubay, Bohol has a code of 071246000 meaning region 07 (Central Visayas), province 12 (Bohol), municipality 46 (Ubay) with barangay code of zero signifying "not at this level." Bongbong, one of its constituent barangays, has a code of 071246007.

The province code is unique and is independent of the region code. All PSGCs, are therefore, unique.

See also 
 Municipalities of Sweden
 List of municipalities of Sweden (with municipality codes)

References

External links 
 City listing with municipality key
 City listing with municipality key

Geocodes
Standards
Public law